Euthyone placida is a moth of the subfamily Arctiinae first described by Schaus in 1896. It is found in São Paulo, Brazil.

References

Lithosiini